Ink Is My Drink is the second full-length album by Panacea. It was released on October 3, 2006 on Rawkus Records. A re-release came in 2011 on Neosonic Productions and called "The Producers Cut", it came with a new cover and some additional skits.

Track listing
"Trip of the Century"
"Invisible Seas"
"Place on Earth"
"Steel Kites"
"Coulda Woulda Shoulda"
"Reel Me In"
"PULSE"
"Work of Art"
"These Words"
"Ecosphere"
"Burning Bush"
"Starlite"
"Sunburst (Bonus)"
"Pupil Stars (Bonus)"

Re-Release 2011 

"Trip of the Century"
"Capsized"
"Invisible Seas"
"Everywhere is the same"
"Place on Earth"
"Steel Kites"
"Coulda Woulda Shoulda"
"Stuck"
"Reel Me In"
"PULSE"
"Love Hurts"
"Work of Art"
"These Words"
"Ecosphere"
"The Expandables"
"Burning Bush"
"Starlite"

References

2006 albums
Rawkus Records albums